The Fridtjof Nansen Prize for Outstanding Research is a Norwegian research award. It is conferred by the Nansen Trust and its associated trusts, and it was established in 1896 after the return of the Fram Expedition. 

The prize is awarded in two categories: a historical-philosophical award, first conferred in 1903, and a mathematical–natural science award, first conferred in 1907. The prize is NOK 150,000. Since 2003, recipients of the Fridtjof Nansen Prize for Outstanding Research have also been awarded the Nansen Medal for Outstanding Research.

Recipients

Historical-philosophical category
The following people have received the Fridtjof Nansen Prize for Outstanding Research in the historical-philosophical category:

Mathematical–natural science category
The following people have received the Fridtjof Nansen Prize for Outstanding Research in the mathematical–natural science category:

References

External links
 Fridtjof Nansen Prize for Outstanding Research, Nansen Trust.  

Norwegian science and technology awards
Awards established in 1896
Fridtjof Nansen
1896 establishments in Norway